I've Been Around is the 2006 release from Ben E. King.  This album was released 45 years after his initial solo release Spanish Harlem.

Track listing

"Here Is My Heart's Desire" – 3:31
"Rhythm Of Love" – 3:45
"Show Me" – 4:26
"I've Been Around" – 5:01
"Just Remember" – 4:26
"You'll Never Know Who's Watching" – 5:08
"Please Stay" – 3:23
"Comparing Her To You" – 4:34
"Fly Away" – 4:26
"I'm Gonna Be The One" – 4:29
"Lady I Love You So" – 4:43
"I Bet You That" – 3:43

References

Ben E. King albums
2006 albums